Scott Davis and David Pate were the defending champions but lost in the quarterfinals to Kevin Curren and Matt Mitchell.

Peter Fleming and John McEnroe won in the final 6–3, 3–6, 6–3 against Paul Annacone and Christo van Rensburg.

Seeds
Champion seeds are indicated in bold text while text in italics indicates the round in which those seeds were eliminated.

Draw

Final

Top half

Bottom half

External links
 1986 Volvo International Doubles Draw

Doubles